Oleksandr Shcherbyna (born 25 January 1931) is a former Soviet racewalker. Born in Kirovohrad in the Ukrainian SSR, he represented his country in the 50 kilometres race walk at the 1960 Summer Olympics, placing fourth. He won two bronze medals in major international competition, coming third at the 1966 European Athletics Championships and 1967 IAAF World Race Walking Cup.

His personal bests were 1:26:46 hours for the 20 kilometres race walk and 3:57:28 hours for the 50 km walk.

International competitions

See also
List of European Athletics Championships medalists (men)

References

External links

 

Possibly living people
1931 births
Soviet male racewalkers
Ukrainian male racewalkers
Olympic athletes of the Soviet Union
Athletes (track and field) at the 1960 Summer Olympics
European Athletics Championships medalists